Aka Høegh (b. 16 December 1947) is a Greenlandic artist. Born in Qullissat on Disko Island, she moved to Qaqortoq in her childhood, and has lived in southern Greenland ever since. As a painter, graphic artist, and sculptor, Høegh focuses on nationalistic expressionism, creating art which reflects local, traditional myths, and is steeped in heritage and local lore. She frequently incorporates legend, nature, and provincial mythos into her works, devising strong connections between her art and local tradition. During the 1970s, she was regularly cited as the main artist in establishing a Greenlandic artistic identity. In September 2013 she was honoured of Nersornaat order.

Major works 
She is most well known for heading the art project "Stone and Man" between the years 1993 and 1994 in her home town of Qaqortoq in southern Greenland. The work is a dynamic, ongoing piece, with more pieces being added to at semi-regular intervals. Initially 18 artists from Sweden, Finland, Norway, and the Faroe Islands participated in the project.

As a member of the international artist group "Art for Life" Høegh is cooperating with eleven other artists to produce the world's largest painting in Spain. The painting's projected size is 24.644 square meters.

Apart from being guest student at the Academy of Arts in Copenhagen, Høegh is an autodidact.

Exhibitions and international co-operation
Høegh has had solo exhibitions in Greenland, Denmark, Faroe Islands, Iceland, Alaska, Germany, Finland, Sweden, Latvia, and Norway, as well as group exhibitions over most of Europe. She represented Greenland in "Scandinavia Today" in the United States, Mexico, and Lithuania.

Høegh's art can be found on many public buildings in Greenland. The relief outside the Workers' Folk High School in her home town Qaqortoq is her work. The chimney of the new power plant is adorned by her artwork, as well.

Personal life 
Høegh has been married to photographer and film artist Ivars Silis since 1976 . The couple have two children, Inuk Silis Høegh (b. 1972) and Bolatta Silis Høegh (b. 1981), both of whom are artists today.

References 

1947 births
Living people
Greenlandic artists
Greenlandic Inuit people
People from Qaqortoq
Disko Island
Greenlandic women artists
20th-century women artists